Filipinos in Pakistan consist of migrants from the Philippines. In 2008, there were an estimated 1,500 Filipinos in Pakistan according to the statistics of the Philippine government. Many Filipinos came to Pakistan for work and those who later married Pakistani men are now holding Pakistani citizenship. Pakistan comparatively has experience good immigration rate from Philippines despite security issues.

Migration history
Many Filipino people entered Pakistan's commercial center Karachi illegally with fake passports and false identity cards as early in 1990s along with hundreds of Nepali, Bengals,  Sri Lankans and Indians however later deported. As of April 2010, there are 546 registered Filipino living in Pakistan who were eligible to vote in 2010 Philippine presidential election as per Philippines Foreign Affairs ministry.

Employment 
Many Filipinos in Pakistan are domestic workers, including the housemaids of high government officials and rich Pakistanis. There are some three Filipino maids at house of former Pakistani Prime Minister Yousaf Raza Gillani and many Filipinos working as chefs in Japanese restaurants in Karachi and Islamabad. 
A small number of Filipinos studying Islam in the country is reported by the Philippines Embassy in Islamabad while thousands of Muslim students from various Southeast Asian countries including Philippines illegally studying in the Pakistani Madrasahs.  Some Filipinos are also nurses in Pakistan.

Relations with Pakistani society 
In 2007, following a state of emergency declared by Pakistani President Pervez Musharraf, about 200 Filipinos gathered in Islamabad on the advice of Ambassador Jimmy Yambao to call for protest. However, there have no direct threats to safety of Filipinos in Pakistan reported.

See also 
 Pakistan–Philippines relations

References

External links 
Article on Filipinos in Pakistan
Human trafficking: FIA opens probe into Filipinas smuggling
From Philippines to Pakistan: Maids can be brought in for only a few thousand rupees

Pakistan
Pakistan
Ethnic groups in Pakistan
Immigration to Pakistan